Anders Mark Lee (born July 3, 1990) is an American professional ice hockey winger and captain of the New York Islanders of the National Hockey League (NHL). Lee attended the University of Notre Dame, where he played hockey for the Fighting Irish ice hockey team. The Islanders drafted him in the sixth round, 151st overall, in the 2009 NHL Entry Draft.

Early life and high school
Lee was born in Edina, Minnesota, a suburb of Minneapolis, to Thomas (Tom) and Lisa Lee. He excelled in football, ice hockey and baseball from a young age. In 2004, he transferred to Saint Thomas Academy high school in Mendota Heights. He made the varsity ice hockey team as an eighth-grader and played alongside Jordan Schroeder. He was also part of St. Thomas Academy's Class A high school hockey tournament, winning the championship in 2006 and playing again in 2007.

In the fall of 2007, Lee transferred back to Edina High School. Although private-to-public school transfers were rare, the daily 20-mile round trip commute to St. Thomas and a desire to play with teammates he grew up with factored into his decision. In his junior year, he made an immediate impact in both football and hockey. In the fall, he won the starting quarterback position and passed for 2,049 yards and 14 touchdowns for the Edina Hornets, who finished with a 10–1 record after losing to the eventual state champion Eden Prairie in the Section 6AAAAA championship game. This was the best finish for the Edina Hornet football team in the past decade. In the winter, he transitioned to hockey, where he finished third in scoring for his team with 54 points (32 goals and 22 assists). He was selected to the Pioneer Press All-State First Team. and received an honorable mention to the AP All-State team. He helped lead the hockey team to a 26–1 regular-season record and a second-place finish in the Class AA 2008 state hockey tournament. In the spring, he played varsity baseball as both a pitcher and third basemen.

As a senior, Lee had a breakout year in football. As quarterback, he passed for 2,007 yards and five touchdowns and ran for 1,105 yards and 32 touchdowns, averaging 308.7 yards of offense per game. He was selected as the 2008 Minnesota Gatorade Football Player of the Year, the Star Tribune All-Metro Player of the Year, and was a finalist for Minnesota's "Mr. Football", losing to now professional player Varmah Sonie. Lee holds the state record for most all-purpose yards in a game, gaining 581 yards (477 passing and 104 rushing) in 42–56 loss to Hopkins High School. Despite the individual on-field success, the Hornets went 6–4 that year and did not make the playoffs.

Lee's success in football carried over to the ice, where he had another successful season for the Hornets ice hockey team. He finished as one of the top scorers in the league during his senior year, scoring 25 goals and 59 assists in 31 games. He led the Hornets to a 24–3 regular-season record and 2009 high school hockey tournament appearance. Despite being the first seed in the tournament bracket, the Hornets lost in the opening round to the eighth seed Moorhead High School. The Hornets would go on to win the consolation final, finishing fifth-place overall in the Class AA tournament. He was a 2009 finalist for the annual "Mr. Hockey" Award, losing to now-professional hockey player and former New York Islanders teammate Nick Leddy. Playing in the pre-season Upper Midwest Elite League, Lee scored 12 goals with 17 assists in 18 games for Team Southwest. Many scouts regarded him as one of the best athletes in the state of Minnesota. While Lee was offered opportunities to play both football and hockey at Harvard and Minnesota, Lee ultimately committed play hockey at the University of Notre Dame.

Playing career

Early career
In the 2009 NHL Entry Draft, Lee was selected in the sixth round, 151st overall, by the New York Islanders. Lee arguably could have gone higher in the draft, but many teams were concerned he would choose football over hockey. Many scouts were also concerned with his skating. He spent the upcoming season playing for the Green Bay Gamblers in the United States Hockey League (USHL) and was their leading scorer. He scored 35 goals with 31 assists and had a team-best +38 plus-minus rating with 54 penalties-in-minutes in 59 games and was chosen for the 2010 All-Star Game. He was named Playoff MVP after scoring 10 goals with 12 assists and finishing +10 in 12 playoff contests. He was also named "Rookie of the Year" for the season. The following season, Lee was the second-leading scorer for the Notre Dame Fighting Irish of the Central Collegiate Hockey Association (CCHA) as a freshman as the team were one of the turnaround stories in college hockey, finishing second in the CCHA after finishing ninth the previous season. He scored a team-leading 24 goals with 20 assists and his 44 points were topped only by fellow freshman T. J. Tynan, who had 54 points. After falling in the CCHA playoff semi-finals and consolation games, Notre Dame rebounded to capture the NCAA Northeast Region and advanced to the Frozen Four, losing to eventual national champion University of Minnesota Duluth in the semi-finals. In the 2011–12 season, Lee was the second-leading scorer for Notre Dame as a sophomore. He scored 17 goals with 17 assists and was minus-one with 24 penalty minutes. The Fighting Irish finished eighth in the league, reaching the tournament quarter-finals against the University of Michigan after defeating Ohio State University in an opening round series.

Professional

New York Islanders
Lee received his first call-up to the Islanders during the 2012–13 season. On April 2, 2013, he scored his first NHL goal in the opening period of his NHL debut, against goaltender Ondřej Pavelec of the Winnipeg Jets. Lee was sent to the team's minor league affiliate, the Bridgeport Sound Tigers of the American Hockey League (AHL), for the following season, but was called up to the Islanders again shortly after the midway point in the season. He began the 2014–15 season with the Sound Tigers but was quickly called back up for a third time to play with the Islanders in a more long-term situation.

Lee had a career year in the 2016–17 season, playing mostly on a line with team captain John Tavares and Josh Bailey, scoring 34 goals. Lee was presented the Bob Nystrom Award for 2016–17 as the Islander who best exemplifies leadership, hustle and dedication.

During the 2017–18 season, Lee again played as left wing on the first line with Bailey and Tavares. Lee was the Islanders' leading scorer with 40 goals, tied for seventh-most in the NHL during the regular season. Lee additionally had 22 assists, making a total of 62 points for the season. On April 23, 2018, he was nominated for the King Clancy Memorial Trophy.

At the beginning of the 2018–19 season, after the departure of John Tavares to the Toronto Maple Leafs, Lee was named the 15th captain of the Islanders. On July 1, 2019, Lee signed a new seven-year, $49 million contract with the Islanders (effective from the 2019–20 season to the end of the 2025–26 season) worth an average annual value of $7 million.

On March 17, 2021, the Islanders announced Lee would miss the remainder of the 2020–21 season to have surgery on a torn ACL sustained after a collision with New Jersey Devils forward Pavel Zacha six days earlier.

Lee achieved his first NHL hat-trick on March 10, 2022, in a 6–0 win against the Columbus Blue Jackets.

Personal life 
Lee started partnering with Jam Kancer in the Kan after seeing a video of cancer patient Fenov Pierre-Louis at a Jam Kancer in the Kan event. Since then, Lee has hosted several events for the organization, raising over $300,000 for childhood cancer, and established the Fenov Pierre-Louis Memorial Scholarship after Pierre-Louis' passing in 2018, which he awards to five high school seniors. Lee's cousin is football player Ryan Connelly who went to Wisconsin. Anders holds a degree in Management Consulting from Notre Dame.

Career statistics

Regular season and playoffs

International

Awards and honors

References

External links

1990 births
Living people
American men's ice hockey centers
Bridgeport Sound Tigers players
Edina High School alumni
Green Bay Gamblers players
Ice hockey players from Minnesota
New York Islanders draft picks
New York Islanders players
Notre Dame Fighting Irish men's ice hockey players
Sportspeople from Edina, Minnesota
AHCA Division I men's ice hockey All-Americans